Christopher Haase (born 26 September 1987 in Kulmbach) is a German professional racing driver. He became the FIA GT3 European Champion in 2009, racing for Lamborghini and Reiter Engineering, and raced in GT1 for the first time in 2010.

He achieved considerable success in the 2014 season, sharing the winning Audi R8 LMS in the Nurburgring 24 Hours, and finishing second in the GTD class of the TUDOR United SportsCar Championship in America.

Born in Kulmbach, Bavaria, Haase began racing in 2006 in the ADAC Dacia Logan Cup, then the ADAC GT Masters series in 2007, and the European GT4 Cup.

Racing record

Complete GT1 World Championship results

Complete Deutsche Tourenwagen Masters results 
(key) (Races in bold indicate pole position) (Races in italics indicate fastest lap)

References

External links
 Official website

1987 births
Living people
People from Kulmbach
Sportspeople from Upper Franconia
German racing drivers
FIA GT Championship drivers
European Le Mans Series drivers
FIA GT1 World Championship drivers
Racing drivers from Bavaria
24 Hours of Daytona drivers
Rolex Sports Car Series drivers
Blancpain Endurance Series drivers
ADAC GT Masters drivers
WeatherTech SportsCar Championship drivers
24 Hours of Spa drivers
24H Series drivers
Deutsche Tourenwagen Masters drivers

Audi Sport drivers
Team Rosberg drivers
Abt Sportsline drivers
Starworks Motorsport drivers
Phoenix Racing drivers
Mücke Motorsport drivers
W Racing Team drivers
Nürburgring 24 Hours drivers
Saintéloc Racing drivers